Gladys Yelvington Parsons (November 29, 1891 – February 11, 1957) was a ragtime composer and friend of May Aufderheide. Parsons was born in Elwood, Indiana. She is best known for "Piffle Rag". After she married Leo Parsons, who ran a cigar store, she fell into relative obscurity.

References 

People from Elwood, Indiana
Songwriters from Indiana
American women composers
American composers
Ragtime composers
1891 births
1957 deaths
20th-century American women musicians